Austrey may refer to:

Austrey, Warwickshire, England
Austrey, South Africa